HDMS Absalon (F341) and her sister ship  are the two members of the . The lead ship of the class is named after Danish archbishop and statesman Absalon and received full operational status in 2007.

Design 
The ships are the first in a series of RDN vessels tasked with carrying out new types of missions, and are to form the backbone of the international operations that the RDN is increasingly focusing on.

The Absalon-class ships are primarily designed for command and support roles, with a large ro-ro deck, but with their many offensive weapons and new anti-submarine weapons and tasks, the class was changed to frigates in 2020.

The three frigates of the succeeding  are similar to the Absalon-class vessels but without the large ro-ro deck.

Absalon is one of a number of vessels to have been filmed by documentary makers to appear on the Mighty Ships TV programme, detailing the capabilities and stories of the ship and crew.

Service

Somali counter-piracy mission
Starting in 2008, HDMS Absalon participated in the UN-led counter-piracy mission off Somalia and the east coast of Africa, acting as flagship to the Danish Task Group which led Task Force 150. In September 2008, as part of the task force, Absalon was involved in the capture of 10 pirates, who were eventually set free. On 3 December 2008, after the mandate had been extended, Absalon rescued a disabled skiff with suspected pirates aboard in the Gulf of Aden, 90 miles off the coast of Yemen; the Somali craft was reported to hold rocket-propelled grenades and AK-47 assault rifles, and to have been adrift for several days. Absalon took the sailors and weapons aboard, sank the craft, and turned the sailors over to the Yemeni Coast Guard. Absalon was reportedly the most successful counter-piracy warship in the Gulf of Aden, capturing 88 out of the 250 pirates detained.

On 16 March 2009, Absalon, along with the Turkish frigate , successfully prevented pirates from capturing the Vietnamese cargo ship .
Absalons counter-piracy mission with NATO Task Force 150 in Somali waters ended 1 April 2009, after resulting in the capture of over 80 pirates, some of whom were transferred to the Netherlands for trial.

On 5 February 2010, Absalon helped to rescue the crew of the Antigua and Barbuda-flagged merchant vessel , which was being hijacked by six armed pirates. Absalon dispatched a helicopter and a special forces team, deterring the pirates. On 1 March 2010, Absalon was reported to have sunk a Somali pirate mother ship carrying several pirate speedboats in the Indian Ocean.

On 7 January 2012, Absalon intercepted and boarded a Somali pirate mother ship in the Indian Ocean. The boarding crew freed 14 Iranian and Pakistani fishermen who had been held as hostages for over two months.

On 30 November 2015, Minister of Defence Peter Christensen, announced that Absalon was to be moved to the Mediterranean Sea, in order to accommodate Turkey's request to NATO, for a larger military presence in the area.

From 7 May to 13 May 2022, Absalon took part in Exercise Mjolner 2022 held in the Arctic region.

References

External links
 
 360° images

Absalon-class support ships
Ships built in Odense
2004 ships
Amphibious warfare vessels of Denmark
Piracy in Somalia